Fashionably Late is the debut album released by Honor Society and the first album to be released under Jonas Records through Hollywood Records. The album was released on September 15, 2009. "Over You" is the album's first single.

Singles
"Where Are You Now" was a single from Fashionably Late. It originally appeared on the soundtrack for the feature film Bandslam.
"Over You" is the first official single from this album released on August 27, 2009.The music video premiered November 13, 2009 on YouTube.

Chart performance
The album debuted on the Billboard Magazine Top 200 at number 18.  It fell to number 183 the following week.

In its first week, the album sold a total of 22,000 units.

Track listing

Personnel
Adapted from the Fashionably Late booklet.

Honor Society
 Michael Bruno – lead vocals, guitar
 Jason Rosen – keyboard, guitar, vocals
 Andrew Lee – bass, vocals
 Alexander Noyes – drums, vocals

Additional musicians
 John Fields – guitars, keyboards, bass, programming (all tracks)
 Ken Chastain – percussion (all tracks)
 Chris Theis – programming, engineer (5)
 Nick Jonas – vocals (3, 7, 8, 10, 12)
 Joe Jonas – vocals (8, 10, 12)
 Kevin Jonas – vocals (8, 12)
 Stephen Lu – string arrangements, conductor, keyboards (1, 3, 6, 12)
 Eric Gorfain – violin (1, 3, 6, 12)
 Daphne Chen – violin (1, 3, 6, 12)
 Wes Precourt – violin (1, 3, 6, 12)
 Radu Pieptea – violin (1, 3, 6, 12)
 Alma Fernandez – viola (1, 3, 6, 12)
 Jessica Van Velzen-Freer – viola (1, 3, 6, 12)
 Richard Dodd – cello (1, 3, 6, 12)
 Michael B. Nelson – horn arrangemnt, trombone (2)
 Steve Strand – lead trumpet (2)
 Dave Jensen – trumpet (2)
 Kenni Holmen – tenor sax (2)
 Kathy Jensen – baritone sax (2)
 Dorian Crozier – drums (11)
 Brian Gallagher – saxophone (11)

Production
 John Fields – producer, mixing
 Paul David Hager – mixing
 Dave McNair – mastering

Imagery
 David Snow – creative director
 Mark Albiani – photography
 Enny Joo – art direction of photography
 Gavin Taylor – packaging, art direction and design

Charts and certification

References

2009 debut albums
Albums produced by John Fields (record producer)
Hollywood Records albums